Kasrineh (also Romanized as Kasrīneh) is a village in Pain Velayat Rural District, in the Central District of Kashmar County, Razavi Khorasan Province, Iran. At the 2006 census, its population was 543 families with 1,964, individuals .

References 

Populated places in Kashmar County